Argja Bóltfelag is a Professional Faroese football club based in Argir. They were playing their 2020 third season in the Faroe Islands Premier League, after being promoted from 1. deild after playing there for 1 season in 2017. After the 2020 season the ended as 9th and played a match against B68 Toftir from 1. deild, the winner would play in the  Faroe Islands Premier League for the 2021 season. AB Argir lost the match 2-3 and were relegated to 1. deild. They play their home games at the Inni í Vika Stadium in Argir.

History
Argja Bóltfelag (or AB) was founded on 15 August 1973 by Danish resident Johnny Nyby and other football enthusiasts on Argjum. In the spring of 1974, the first board was elected. This composed of Johnny Nyby, Chairman; Fróði Olsen, Co-Chairman; Sonja á Argjaboða, accountant; and Kristian Arge, board writer. Other members of the board were Erling Olsen, Sæmundur Mortenen and Jens Hansen. In the same year, the team started in the regular competition.

Initially the team didn't have very good training facilities and rented a school playground. Later they got a small ground to train on, but it was only 20 x 40 m² in measurements. There was no football field on Argjum at the time, but they were allowed to loan the Gundadalur, which belongs to HB and B36. AB practiced and played their matches at the Gundadalur and this helped the team to survive.

In 1983, a football field was built on Argjum and now had better training facilities. Having their own ground helped the team a lot and in 1985, a new two-storey house was built for AB. AB got the lower storey and the second storey was used as a school classroom.

In 1998, artificial grass was laid on the football field. For some years, the second storey remained as a school classroom for young children. By 2004, AB had grown enough to get the whole house.

From 2000, Tórálvur Stenberg became the chairman of AB and he brought them from the 3rd division all the way to Formuladeildin in 2006. Sadly, he did not see AB play in Formuladeildina, because he died of cancer in the autumn. Stenberg was the first to become an honorary member of the team. He put his life and soul into Argja Bóltfelag. Two of his sons, Jónas and Heðin Stenberg, play for AB.

AB's first season in the Vodafonedeildin wasn't very successful and were relegated along with VB/Sumba, finishing in 9th place. Though in the season afterwards, they bounced right back and were promoted again after finishing runners-up in 1. deild. After spending three years (2014, 2015 and 2016) in the highest series, the team ended the 2016 season in 9th place and got relegated. Although in 2017, AB got promoted from 1. deild after playing there for 1 season in 2017. AB has then been in Betrideildin in 2018, 2019 and also in 2020.

AB´s second team has played in 2. deild, but in 2019 the team qualified to 1. deild for 2020. After the 2020 season the team was relegated to 2. deild.

Honours
 1. deild: 1
 2017
 2. deild: 1
 2002

First team squad

Current squad

As of 10 November 2022

Technical staff
As of the year 2020.

 Manager:  Tonny Brimsvík and  Símun Samuelsen
 U21 Manager:  Nikolaj Eriksen
 Fitness coach:  Sólrun Gleðisheygg

Player of the year
Starting from 2006, the club has annually named its player of the year. Players still playing for the club are marked in bold:

Managers
 Oddbjørn Joensen (2000–2001)
 Sámal Erik Hentze (2002–2003)
 Kári Reynheim (2004)
 Jóannes Jakobsen (2005)
 Rúni Nolsøe (2006)
 Oddbjørn Joensen (January – May 31, 2007)
 Sigfríður Clementsen (June 1, 2007 – Dec 31, 2007)
 Allan Mørkøre (2008 – July 31, 2010)
 Sámal Erik Hentze (Aug 1, 2010 – Dec 31, 2013)
 Bill McLeod Jacobsen (Jan 1, 2014 – April 16, 2014)
 Oddbjörn Joensen (April 17, 2014 – May 31, 2015)
 Sámal Erik Hentze (June 1, 2015 – Dec 31, 2015)
 Trygvi Mortensen (2016)
 Kári Reynheim (2017)
 Sorin Anghel (2018–2019)
 Tonny Brimsvík (2020-2021) and  Símun Samuelsen (2020-2021)
 Jonas Dal (6 Aug 2021 - present)

Youth teams
Argja Bóltfelag also has youth teams. There are 16 youth teams, based on gender and age, with the youngest team for the age of 6–8 and the oldest for 21 years of age. There are more than 20 coaches for these youth players.

See also

Argja Bóltfelag Women's Team
List of football clubs in the Faroe Islands

References

External links
Argja Bóltfelag official website (in Faroese)
Frensurin fan Club (in Faroese)

 
Association football clubs established in 1973
1973 establishments in the Faroe Islands